Ocean & Earth is a privately owned company based in Sussex Inlet, New South Wales, Australia. The company sells swimwear and sportswear, as well as surfing products and surfboards.  

It was founded in 1978 by Brian Cregan and Graham Williams. The company was later established by Brian Cregan and their partners in 1978 when they started producing a couple of basic surfing products. Ocean & Earth slowly grew by establishing a network of retailers throughout New South Wales and southern Queensland (Australia).

See also

 List of swimwear brands

List of fitness wear brands

References

External links 
 www.oceanandearth.com.au

Sporting goods manufacturers of Australia
Clothing brands of Australia
Australian brands
Swimwear manufacturers
Surfwear brands
Retail companies of Australia
Multinational companies headquartered in Australia
Surfing in Australia
Clothing companies established in 1978
Privately held companies of Australia
Manufacturing companies established in 1978
Australian companies established in 1978